Agyaa is a village in Domariaganj, Uttar Pradesh, India.

References 

Villages in Siddharthnagar district